Shamil Serikov (5 March 1956 in Alma-Ata, Kazakh SSR – 22 November 1989) was a Soviet wrestler and Olympic Champion.

He competed at the 1980 Summer Olympics in Moscow where he won a gold medal in Greco-Roman wrestling, the bantamweight class. Serikov committed suicide in 1989.

References

1956 births
1989 suicides
Sportspeople from Almaty
Soviet male sport wrestlers
Olympic wrestlers of the Soviet Union
Wrestlers at the 1980 Summer Olympics
Kazakhstani male sport wrestlers
Olympic gold medalists for the Soviet Union
Olympic medalists in wrestling
Suicides in the Soviet Union
Medalists at the 1980 Summer Olympics
Suicides in Kazakhstan